Michael R. Rogers (born October 24, 1954) is a Canadian retired professional ice hockey centre who played five seasons in the World Hockey Association, followed by seven seasons in the National Hockey League.

Playing career
Rogers was drafted by both the Vancouver Canucks (5th round, 77th overall) of the NHL and the Edmonton Oilers (4th round, 48th overall) of the WHA in 1974. He chose to start his professional career with the Oilers, and was the Oilers' team-scoring champion in their third (1974–75) season.

Rogers was traded to the New England Whalers, with whom he entered the NHL when the leagues merged for the 1979–80 NHL season.

Rogers shares elite company in that he is one of only four players to have scored 100 or more points in his first three NHL seasons, the others being Wayne Gretzky, Mario Lemieux and Peter Stastny.

Rogers was the colour commentator for the Calgary Flames on Calgary radio stations for 12 years before announcing his retirement on July 25, 2013.

Legacy

In the 2009 book 100 Ranger Greats, the authors ranked Rogers at No. 88 all-time of the 901 New York Rangers who had played during the team’s first 82 seasons.

Career statistics

Regular season and playoffs

International

See also
 List of NHL players with 100-point seasons

References

External links
 

1954 births
Living people
Calgary Centennials players
Calgary Flames announcers
Canadian expatriate ice hockey players in Switzerland
Canadian ice hockey centres
Edmonton Oilers (WHA) draft picks
Edmonton Oilers (WHA) players
Edmonton Oilers players
Hartford Whalers captains
Hartford Whalers players
HC Ambrì-Piotta players
New England Whalers players
New Haven Nighthawks players
New York Rangers players
Nova Scotia Oilers players
Ice hockey people from Calgary
Vancouver Canucks draft picks